The European Magnetic Field Laboratory (EMFL) gathers the efforts of three laboratories in Germany, France, and the Netherlands: the Dresden High Magnetic Field Laboratory (HLD), the Laboratoire National des Champs Magnétiques Intenses (LNCMI) in Grenoble and Toulouse and the High Field Magnet Laboratory (HFML) in Nijmegen. EMFL was an initiative of Prof. Jan Kees Maan, former director of HFML in Nijmegen.

Research in the high field magnets of the EMFL leads to new insights in material properties. Any kind of material can be explored in a high magnetic field, for example superconductors, biological molecules and nanostructures. This project is financially supported by the European Commission.

The “ISABEL” project is a four-year project (2020-2024) of eighteen partners, funded within Horizon 2020 and coordinated by LNCMI. The principal goal of this project is to ensure the long-term sustainability of the EMFL and define a roadmap for its future development.

The “SuperEMFL” project runs for four years (2021-2024), likewise funded within Horizon 2020 and coordinated by LNCMI. The project is a design study aiming at the development of the high-temperature superconductor (HTS) technology, providing the EMFL with much higher superconducting fields and novel superconducting magnet geometries.

Mission 
It is the mission of the EMFL to generate the highest possible magnetic fields for use in scientific research and make them available to the scientific community. The EMFL provides pulsed (in Toulouse and Dresden) as well as static magnetic fields (Grenoble and Nijmegen).

A call for proposal is launched twice a year for users to get access to the facilities. The best projects are chosen by a European selection committee, composed of experts from around the world.

The three laboratories 
 HFML (Nijmegen, The Netherlands) is operated by the Radboud University (RU) and the Dutch Research Council (NWO). Its director is Prof. Dr. Peter Christianen
 HLD (Dresden, Germany) is part of the Helmholtz-Zentrum Dresden-Rossendorf. Its director is Prof. Dr. Joachim Wosnitza.
 LNCMI (Grenoble & Toulouse, France) is a laboratory of the CNRS, associated to several universities: UJF, INSA and UPS. Continuous field are available in Grenoble and pulsed field in Toulouse. The LNCMI is managed by Dr. Charles Simon.

Klaus von Klitzing discovered the Quantum Hall effect at the LNCMI (Nobel prize of Physics of 1985).
 Andre Geim and Konstantin Novoselov have been awarded the Nobel Prize for Physics 2010 for the discovery of graphene, the thinnest material in the world. They explored the material in the High Field Magnet Laboratory.

References 

Science and technology in Europe
European Union and science and technology
Science and technology in Grenoble